Joachim B. Hansen (born 26 May 1979) is a Norwegian retired mixed martial artist. He began his career fighting for FinnFight before moving on to fight for Shooto where he became the first Scandinavian person to hold an MMA world title after winning the Shooto World Lightweight Championship in 2003 from Takanori Gomi. Hansen later fought for the Pride Fighting Championship and most recently Dream where he became the Dream Lightweight Champion.

Background
Hansen was born in Oslo, Norway to a Norwegian father and Scottish mother. Aside from his career as a fighter, he has a job driving an oil tanker. Hansen's passion in martial arts began after seeing Jackie Chan films in his youth and he began training in Brazilian jiu-jitsu when he was 19 years old. He is good friends with former UFC veteran and Norwegian Brazilian jiu-jitsu specialist John Olav Einemo.

Mixed martial arts career

FinnFight and Shooto
Joachim "Hellboy" Hansen began his career fighting for Finnish promotion FinnFight before moving on to fight for Shooto's Finnish branch. His performance got him invited to Shooto's year-end show in 2002 where he, with a 3–1 record, faced Takumi Nakayama who at the time had 14 fights under his belt. Hansen won a majority decision. Hansen's performance impressed Shooto-veteran Rumina Sato who challenged Hansen after the match. Three months later the two met, with Hansen defeating the Japanese fighter two minutes into the bout by TKO. The win set him up for a title shot against the Shooto Lightweight Champion, and at the time 14–0, Takanori Gomi. The fight went the distance with Hansen being awarded a majority decision, making him the Shooto Lightweight Champion and first Scandinavian person to hold a MMA world title. Hansen's first title defense was against another undefeated fighter in Vítor Ribeiro who took away Hansen's title by submitting him two minutes into the second round.

Pride Fighting championships

Hansen went on to win his next seven fights, most notably against Gesias Calvancanti, Caol Uno, Masakazu Imanari and Yves Edwards, before losing a decision to Hayato Sakurai in the semi-finals of the Pride 2005 Lightweight tournament. He then challenged Tatsuya Kawajiri for the Shooto Welterweight Championship, but lost by disqualification due to a kick to the groin of Kawajiri. Hansen then went 2–2 in his next four fights, losing to Shinya Aoki and Eiji Mitsuoka, before his next big win against Kazuyuki Miyata at K-1 Premium 2007 Dynamite!!.

Dream
On 15 March 2008 Hansen entered Dream's 16-man 2008 Lightweight Grand-Prix tournament. In the first round of the tournament he faced and defeated Japanese fighter Kotetsu Boku by unanimous decision at Dream 1. The win set him up for a quarterfinal bout against Eddie Alvarez, at Dream 3. Hansen and Alvarez were given a standing ovation for their "outstanding fights" by the entire crowd after their match. After a close fight Alvarez was awarded a unanimous decision and advanced to the Dream 5: Lightweight Grand Prix 2008 Final Round. The fight was described by MMAWeekly as "a fifteen-minute war" and that it would be a "fight of the year candidate", while Sherdog called it a "riveting 15-minute war" and an "epic battle".

At Dream 5 Hansen defeated Kultar Gill in a reserve bout for the tournament. This became Hansen's ticket to the final after Alvarez, who went on to defeat Tatsuya Kawajiri in the semi-final, but was forced to withdraw due to a cut under his right eye. In the final, Hansen faced Japanese submission-specialist Shinya Aoki, who had previously defeated Hansen at Pride Shockwave 2006. In the fight Aoki used his grappling experience to try and submit Hansen after taking him down, but the Norwegian escaped and responded with powerful ground-and-pound which hurt Aoki and eventually forced the referee to step in. The win made Hansen the 2008 Dream Lightweight Grand Prix Champion and the first ever Dream Lightweight Champion. After the bout Hansen told the crowd he wanted his first title defense to be against Eddie Alvarez whom he replaced, and who had previously eliminated him from the tournament.

Hansen's next fight was set to be against Gesias Calvancante at Dynamite!! 2008 on 31 December 2008, but the bout was canceled the day of the event due to Hansen not passing pre-fight medicals and subsequently being hospitalized for a "head injury". It was later clarified that the injury stemmed from a teammate landing awkwardly on Hansen's head after a takedown during warm-up, resulting with Hansen being rushed to the hospital where he was diagnosed with a concussion. In February 2009 Hansen was reported as being healthy and was in negotiations with Dream about his first title defense. His first title defense was on 6 October 2009 when he lost the title to Shinya Aoki.

Hansen faced Bibiano Fernandes on 22 March 2010 at Dream 13 for the Dream Featherweight Championship. He lost the match in a split decision.

Hansen lost to Hiroyuki Takaya on 29 May 2010 at Dream 14 by Knockout

Hansen defeated Hideo Tokoro on 25 September at Dream 16 with a Submission (Triangle Choke) 2:48 in the first round.

Returning to Scandinavia, Hansen fought Usama Aziz at Superior Challenge 6 29 October 2010. Hansen defeated Aziz 3:47 in the second round by submission.

Hansen fought Mitsuhiro Ishida on 29 May 2011 at Dream: Fight for Japan!. Hansen won via split decision.

Hansen faced Tatsuya Kawajiri in a featherweight bout at Dream 17 at Saitama Super Arena in Saitama, Japan, on 24 Sept. He lost the fight via submission in the third round.

Despite having an almost two-year hiatus, Hansen then faced Doo Won Seo (on a six fight winning streak) at ROAD FC 11 in Seo's backyard Seoul, South Korea. in which he defeated Seo via submission (arm triangle choke) at 2:24 into the second round.

Kickboxing career
Hansen debuted as a professional kickboxer at the Shoot Boxing World Tournament 2012 in Tokyo, Japan on 17 November 2012. The Shoot Boxing World Tournament, or "S-Cup", is an eight-man, 70 kg standing vale tudo tournament that combines striking, throws and submissions held by the Shoot Boxing Association once every two years. He was drawn against Hiroaki Suzuki at the quarter-final stage and lost by unanimous decision after an extension round.

In his sophomore apprearence as a shootboxer, Hansen gained his first win as he took a unanimous decision victory over Kenji Kanai at Shoot Boxing 2013 - Act 1 in Tokyo on 22 February 2013.

Personal life
Hansen has various tattoos. The tattoo on his right arm is an odal rune and it stands for spiritual heritage. The tattoo on his left arm is Viking art mixed with Celtic art. This relates to his bloodline as his grandmother is a descendant of a Scottish clan. On the inside of his left arm is Thor's hammer. Hansen enjoys heavy metal music and playing the guitar. Hansen retired from MMA in December 2016. In a Facebook message from his then manager Aron Jahnsen, Hansen suffered a stroke and despite later being offered a fight for a European organization, he reportedly turned it down.

Championships and accomplishments

Martial arts
Brazilian Jiu-Jitsu
2nd place in European Cup (1999), 74 kg (163 lb) advanced division.
1st place in Finnish Open (1999), 75 kg (165 lb) division
3rd place in European Cup (1999), 80 kg (176 lb) division
Did not place in BJJ Munidals (2000)
2nd place in BJJ Open in London (2001), 73 kg (161 lb) blue belt division.
3rd place in BJJ Open in London (2001), absolute/open weight blue/purple belt division.

Submission grappling
2nd place in Helsinki Submission Wrestling (1999), 65 kg (143 lb) division.
1st place in Finnish Open (1999), 70 kg (154 lb) division.
1st place in Finnish Open (2000), 70 kg (154 lb) division.
1st place in Scandinavian Open (2000), 76 kg (167 lb) division.
1st place in Bad Boy Cup (2000), 70 kg (154 lb) division.
1st place in Finnish Open (2001), 79 kg (174 lb) division.
1st place in Frank Shamrock Invitational (2001), 70 kg (154 lb) division.
1st place in King of the Beach (2001), 78 kg (172 lb) division.
1st place in Scandinavian Open (2002), 73 kg (161 lb) division.
Scandinavia Wrestling Submission Wrestling Champion (1999 and 2000).

Mixed martial arts
DREAM
DREAM Lightweight Championship (1 time, first)
2008 DREAM Lightweight Grand Prix Champion
Professional Shooto Japan
Shooto Welterweight Champion (1 time)

Kickboxing record

|-  bgcolor="#CCFFCC"
| 2013-02-22 || Win ||align=left| Kenji Kanai || Shoot Boxing 2013 - Act 1 || Tokyo, Japan || Decision (unanimous) || 3 || 3:00 || 1-1
|-  bgcolor="#FFBBBB"
| 2012-11-17 || Loss ||align=left| Hiroaki Suzuki || Shoot Boxing World Tournament 2012, Quarter Finals || Tokyo, Japan || Extension round decision (unanimous) || 4 || 3:00 || 0-1
|-
| colspan=9 | Legend:

Mixed martial arts record

|-
| Loss
| align=center| 23–14–1
| Tsuneo Kimura
| Decision (unanimous)
| Shooto: Fight Collection in Okinawa
| 
| align=center| 3
| align=center| 5:00
| Okinawa, Japan
| 
|-
| Loss
| align=center| 23–13–1
| Diego Nunes
| KO (punch)
| Superior Challenge 11
| 
| align=center| 2
| align=center| 1:51
| Södertälje, Sweden
| For Superior Challenge Featherweight Championship
|-
| Loss
| align=center| 23–12–1
| Doo Won Seo
| KO (punches)
| ROAD FC 15
| 
| align=center| 1
| align=center| 0:15
| Wonju, South Korea
| 
|-
| Win
| align=center| 23–11–1
| Doo Won Seo
| Submission (arm-triangle choke)
| ROAD FC 11
| 
| align=center| 2
| align=center| 3:14
| Seoul, South Korea
| 
|-
| Loss
| align=center| 22–11–1
| Tatsuya Kawajiri
| Submission (arm-triangle choke)
| Dream 17
| 
| align=center| 3
| align=center| 2:30
| Saitama, Japan
| 
|-
| Win
| align=center| 22–10–1
| Mitsuhiro Ishida
| Decision (split)
| Dream: Fight for Japan!
| 
| align=center| 2
| align=center| 5:00
| Saitama, Japan
| 
|-
| Win
| align=center| 21–10–1
| Sami Aziz
| Submission (armbar)
| Super Challenge 6
| 
| align=center| 2
| align=center| 3:47
| Stockholm, Sweden
| 
|-
| Win
| align=center| 20–10–1
| Hideo Tokoro
| Submission (triangle choke)
| DREAM 16
| 
| align=center| 1
| align=center| 2:48
| Nagoya, Japan
| 
|-
| Loss
| align=center| 19–10–1
| Hiroyuki Takaya
| KO (punches)
| DREAM 14
| 
| align=center| 1
| align=center| 4:27
| Saitama, Japan
| 
|-
| Loss
| align=center| 19–9–1
| Bibiano Fernandes
| Decision (split)
| DREAM 13
| 
| align=center| 2
| align=center| 5:00
| Yokohama, Japan
| 
|-
| Loss
| align=center| 19–8–1
| Shinya Aoki
| Submission (armbar)
| DREAM 11
| 
| align=center| 2
| align=center| 4:56
| Yokohama, Japan
| 
|-
| Win
| align=center| 19–7–1
| Shinya Aoki
| TKO (punches)
| Dream 5: Lightweight Grand Prix 2008 Final Round
| 
| align=center| 1
| align=center| 4:19
| Osaka, Japan
| 
|-
| Win
| align=center| 18–7–1
| Kultar Gill
| Submission (armbar)
| Dream 5: Lightweight Grand Prix 2008 Final Round
| 
| align=center| 1
| align=center| 2:33
| Osaka, Japan
| 
|-
| Loss
| align=center| 17–7–1
| Eddie Alvarez
| Decision (unanimous)
| Dream 3: Lightweight Grand Prix 2008 Second Round
| 
| align=center| 2
| align=center| 5:00
| Saitama, Saitama, Japan
| 
|-
| Win
| align=center| 17–6–1
| Kotetsu Boku
| Decision (unanimous)
| Dream 1: Lightweight Grand Prix 2008 First Round
| 
| align=center| 2
| align=center| 5:00
| Saitama, Saitama, Japan
| 
|-
| Win
| align=center| 16–6–1
| Kazuyuki Miyata
| Submission (rear-naked choke)
| Dynamite!! 2007
| 
| align=center| 2
| align=center| 1:33
| Osaka, Japan
| 
|-
| Loss
| align=center| 15–6–1
| Eiji Mitsuoka
| Decision (majority)
| Shooto: Back To Our Roots 6
| 
| align=center| 3
| align=center| 5:00
| Tokyo, Japan
| 
|-
| Win
| align=center| 15–5–1
| Jason Ireland
| Submission (armbar)
| Pride 33 - The Second Coming
| 
| align=center| 3
| align=center| 2:33
| Las Vegas, Nevada, United States
| 
|-
| Loss
| align=center| 14–5–1
| Shinya Aoki
| Submission (gogoplata)
| Pride Shockwave 2006
| 
| align=center| 1
| align=center| 2:24
| Saitama, Japan
| 
|-
| Win
| align=center| 14–4–1
| Luiz Azeredo
| KO (knee)
| Pride - Bushido 10
| 
| align=center| 1
| align=center| 7:09
| Tokyo, Japan
| 
|-
| Loss
| align=center| 13–4–1
| Tatsuya Kawajiri
| DQ (kick to groin)
| Shooto: The Victory of the Truth
| 
| align=center| 1
| align=center| 0:08
| Tokyo, Japan
| 
|-
| Loss
| align=center| 13–3–1
| Hayato Sakurai
| Decision (unanimous)
| Pride: Bushido 9
| 
| align=center| 2
| align=center| 5:00
| Tokyo, Japan
| 
|-
| Win
| align=center| 13–2–1
| Yves Edwards
| Decision (split)
| Pride: Bushido 9
| 
| align=center| 2
| align=center| 5:00
| Tokyo, Japan
| 
|-
| Win
| align=center| 12–2–1
| Kenichiro Togashi
| Decision (unanimous)
| Shooto: Alive Road
| 
| align=center| 3
| align=center| 5:00
| Yokohama, Japan
| 
|-
| Win
| align=center| 11–2–1
| Masakazu Imanari
| KO (knee)
| Pride: Bushido 8
| 
| align=center| 1
| align=center| 2:34
| Nagoya, Japan
| 
|-
| Win
| align=center| 10–2–1
| Caol Uno
| KO (knee)
| K-1 - Hero's 1
| 
| align=center| 3
| align=center| 4:48
| Saitama, Japan
| 
|-
| Win
| align=center| 9–2–1
| Sergey Golyaev
| Submission (rear-naked choke)
| Euphoria – Road to the Titles
| 
| align=center| 1
| align=center| 3:24
| Atlantic City, New Jersey, United States
| 
|-
| Win
| align=center| 8–2–1
| Gesias Cavalcante
| Decision (majority)
| Shooto: 7/16 in Korakuen Hall
| 
| align=center| 3
| align=center| 5:00
| Tokyo, Japan
| 
|-
| Win
| align=center| 7–2–1
| Metin Yakut
| TKO (punches)
| Shooto Finland: Capital Punishment 2
| 
| align=center| 2
| align=center| 3:50
| Helsinki, Finland
| 
|-
| Loss
| align=center| 6–2–1
| Vítor Ribeiro
| Submission (arm-triangle choke)
| Shooto - Year End Show 2003
| 
| align=center| 2
| align=center| 2:37
| Chiba, Chiba, Japan
| 
|-
| Win
| align=center| 6–1–1
| Takanori Gomi
| Decision (majority)
| Shooto - 8/10 in Yokohama Cultural Gymnasium
| 
| align=center| 3
| align=center| 5:00
| Yokohama, Japan
| 
|-
| Win
| align=center| 5–1–1
| Rumina Sato
| TKO (punches)
| Shooto - 3/18 in Korakuen Hall
| 
| align=center| 1
| align=center| 2:09
| Tokyo, Japan
| 
|-
| Win
| align=center| 4–1–1
| Takumi Nakayama
| Decision (majority)
| Shooto: Year End Show 2002
| 
| align=center| 3
| align=center| 5:00
| Chiba, Japan
| 
|-
| Win
| align=center| 3–1–1
| Sami Hyyppa
| Submission
| Shooto Finland: The First Time
| 
| align=center| 1
| align=center| 4:00
| Turku, Finland
| 
|-
| Draw
| align=center| 2–1–1
| Rafles la Rose
| Draw
| CW 3
| 
| align=center| 2
| align=center| 5:00
| Galway, Ireland
| 
|-
| Win
| align=center| 2–1
| Olof Inger
| Decision
| Finnfight 5
| 
| align=center| N/A
| align=center| N/A
| Turku, Finland
| 
|-
| Loss
| align=center| 1–1
| Jani Lax
| Submission (rear-naked choke)
| Finnfight 4
| 
| align=center| 1
| align=center| 9:25
| Turku, Finland
| 
|-
| Win
| align=center| 1–0
| Marcus Peltonen
| TKO
| Finnfight 3
| 
| align=center| 1
| align=center| 1:38
| Turku, Finland
|

See also
List of male mixed martial artists

References

External links

1979 births
Living people
Norwegian male mixed martial artists
Bantamweight mixed martial artists
Featherweight mixed martial artists
Lightweight mixed martial artists
Mixed martial artists utilizing shootboxing
Mixed martial artists utilizing Brazilian jiu-jitsu
Mixed martial artists utilizing Gaidojutsu
Norwegian male kickboxers
Middleweight kickboxers
Norwegian practitioners of Brazilian jiu-jitsu
People awarded a black belt in Brazilian jiu-jitsu
Norwegian people of Scottish descent
Sportspeople from Oslo
Dream (mixed martial arts) champions